Richard Court is an 11-story 90-unit residential court split into 2 separate buildings around the Richard Court. Richard court is a small court that leads straight into the City Creek Center. Richard Court is located opposite from the Salt Lake Temple and consists of brick facade, retail outlets on the ground floor and underground parking.

History
The 11-storey building was planned with the City Creek Center and was one of the first building in the redevelopment to be constructed. Richard court was designed to channel pedestrian traffic from temple square to the City Creek Center with the two residential buildings on each side.

Design
The residential buildings were designed by FFKR Architects and ZGF Architects who also designed other parts of the City Creek Center including The Regent and 99 West on South Temple (99 West). The main contractor was Okland Construction and the project received a Gold LEED certification.

See also
 99 West on South Temple
 The Regent (City Creek)
 City Creek Center

References

External links

 Official website

Residential condominiums in the United States
Residential skyscrapers in Salt Lake City